Kremer is a German, Dutch, and Jewish (Ashkenazic) surname cognate to Kramer.  


People 
Amy Kremer (born 1970/71), American Tea Party political activist
Andrea Kremer (b. 1959), American television sports journalist
Andrzej Kremer (1961–2010), Polish lawyer and diplomat, Deputy Minister of Foreign Affairs
Anje Kremer (b. 1943), Dutch-born New Zealand speed skater
Anne Kremer (b. 1975), Luxembourgish tennis player
Annemarie Kremer (b. 1974), Dutch operatic soprano
Arkadi Kremer (1865–1935), Russian socialist leader, founder of the Jewish Labour Bund, husband of Pati Kremer
Armin Kremer (b. 1968), German rally driver
Bob Kremer (b. 1936), American (Nebraska) politician
Cecile B. Kremer, American Republican operative
Daniel J. Kremer (b. 1937), American (Californian) justice
Dean Kremer (b. 1996), Israeli-American baseball pitcher
Felix A. Kremer (1872–1940), American lawyer and Progressive politician in Wisconsin
George Kremer (1775–1854), American Jacksonian politician
Gerard de Kremer (1512–1594), Flemish cartographer, geographer and cosmographer known as Gerardus Mercator
Gidon Kremer (b. 1947), Latvian violinist and conductor
Hans Kremer (b. 1954), German film actor
Howard Kremer (b. 1971), American comedian
I. Raymond Kremer (1921–1999), American attorney and judge in Philadelphia
Isa Kremer (1887–1956), Russian-born soprano
Jerry Kremer (b. 1935), American (New York) Democratic politician and attorney
Jesse Kremer (b. 1977), American (Wisconsin) Republican politician
Johann Kremer (1883–1965), German Nazi physician
Joseph-François Kremer (b. 1954), French composer, conductor, cellist and musicologist
Józef Kremer (1806–1875), Polish philosopher
Ken Kremer (b. 1957), American football defensive tackle
Kurt Kremer (b. 1956), German physicist
Leon Kremer (1901–1941), Polish chess master
Marcos Kremer (b. 1997), Argentine rugby player
Marie Kremer (b. 1982), Belgian actress
Maurice Kremer (1824–1907), American businessman and civil servant
Max Kremer (b. 1969), German football forward
Michael Kremer (b. 1964), American development economist
Mira Kremer (1905–1987), German chess master
Mitzi Kremer (b. 1968), American swimmer
Mykola Kremer, Ukrainian sprint canoer
Naomie Kremer (b. 1953), Israeli-born American painter and video artist
Pati Kremer (1867–1943), Russian revolutionary socialist, wife of Arkadi Kremer
Paul Kremer (b. 1971), American modern painter
Peter Kremer (b. 1958), German theatre and television actor
Ray Kremer (1893–1965), American baseball pitcher
René Kremer (1925–2002), Luxembourgian decathlete and handball player
Romain Kremer (b. 1982), French fashion designer
Stevie Kremer (b. 1982), American ski mountaineer and long-distance runner
Theodore Kremer (1871–1923), German-born playwright
Tom Kremer (1930–2017), Romanian game inventor and marketer
Victor Kremer (1932–2010), Luxembourgian sports shooter
Warren Kremer (1921–2003), American comics artist
Willibert Kremer (1939–2021), German football player and coach
Wolfgang Kremer (b. 1945), German swimmer
Melissa Kremer

See also 
 Kremer prize, awarded to pioneers of human-powered flight; established by Henry Kremer
 Kremer Racing, a Cologne-based Porsche racing team founded by racer Erwin Kremer

 Kremers, surname
 Cremer (disambiguation)
 Kramer (disambiguation)
 Krämer

References

Dutch-language surnames
Jewish surnames
German-language surnames
Yiddish-language surnames
Occupational surnames